The Arab Gymnastics Championships is a competition which is organized by the Arab Gymnastics Union for Arab countries for the gymnastics disciplines artistic and rhythmic.

Editions

All-time medal table

References

 
Arab
Recurring sporting events established in 2018